Aditya Engineering College is a private college in Surampalem on over  of green space in Peddapuram, Kakinada, Andhra Pradesh, India.

References

https://www.aec.edu.in/
Blog by aditya engineering college student, TechWebSter

External links

Engineering colleges in Andhra Pradesh
Universities and colleges in Kakinada district
Educational institutions established in 2001
2001 establishments in Andhra Pradesh